Heinz Mack (born March 8, 1931) is a German artist. Together with Otto Piene he founded the ZERO movement in 1957. He exhibited works at documenta in 1964 and 1977 and he represented Germany at the 1970 Venice Biennale. He is best known for his contributions to op art, light art and kinetic art.

Biography 

Heinz Mack was born in 1931 in the small town of Lollar in Germany. Between 1950 and 1956 he studied at the Kunstakademie Düsseldorf. In 1957 together with Otto Piene he started a series of what were called Abendausstellungen (evening exhibitions) at their studio in Düsseldorf. This series was the initial event for the formation of the group ZERO (with Mack, Piene and Günther Uecker as its nucleus) and the international ZERO movement. Among the participants of the ZERO movement were Yves Klein, Lucio Fontana, Piero Manzoni and Jean Tinguely.

In the early 1960s, Mack worked, with Gotthard Graubner, as an art teacher at the Lessing Gymnasium, Düsseldorf.  In 1964 Mack, Piene and Uecker arranged the "ZERO Lichtraum (Hommage á Lucio Fontana)" at the 1964 documenta in Kassel. From 1964 to 1966 Mack lived and worked in New York where the Howard Wise Gallery presented a solo exhibition in 1966.

Although known for his minimalist outdoor sculptures, Mack also produced smaller works, both static and kinetic.  Light Dynamo #2' from 1966, in the collection of the Honolulu Museum of Art, is an example of his rotating disc kinetic sculptures.  Since 1991, he has been producing brightly colored, abstract, paintings in acrylic.

1970 Mack was invited as visiting professor to Osaka, Japan. In the same year he represented Germany at the 1970 Venice Biennale (together with Günther Uecker, Georg Karl Pfahler and Thomas Lenk).  For the 1972 Summer Olympics in Munich he created an illuminated "Wasserwolke" (Water cloud).  In 1972 he was asked to create a 230 ft tall sculpture for the United Nations headquarters in New York (not realized).

Solo exhibitions 

1957: Galerie Schmela, Düsseldorf
1966: Howard Wise Gallery, New York
1972: Musée d’Art Moderne de la Ville de Paris
1977: Kunsthalle Düsseldorf
1981: Galerie Lauter, Mannheim
1989: Galerie Neher, Essen
1992: Galerie Lauter, Mannheim
1993: Galerie Schoeller, Düsseldorf
1998: Liechtensteinische Staatliche Kunstsammlungen, Vaduz
2001: Galerie Denise René, Paris
2001: Tehran Museum of Contemporary Art, Teheran
2004: Galerie Geiger, Konstanz
2006: Beck & Eggeling International Fine Art, Düsseldorf
2006: Pergamonmuseum and Museum of Islamic Art, Berlin
2009: Ludwig Museum, Koblenz
2022: Biblioteca Nazionale Marciana, Venecia

Gallery

Publications 

 Heinz Mack. TRANSIT – zwischen Okzident und Orient. Faszination und Inspiration der Islamischen Kultur im Werk des Künstlers – ein Werkaspekt 1950-2006. Museum für Islamische Kunst, Pergamonmuseum, Berlin. Exhib.: October 7, 2006 – January 21, 2007. .
 Heinz Mack – Licht der ZERO-Zeit. Ludwig Museum im Deutschherrenhaus, Koblenz. Exhib.: August 30 – November 1, 2009.

Footnotes

External links
  ZERO foundation
 Literature by and on Heinz Mack 

1931 births
Living people
People from Giessen (district)
German artists
Knights Commander of the Order of Merit of the Federal Republic of Germany
Kunstakademie Düsseldorf alumni
People from the People's State of Hesse